Narasimhagupta (Gupta script:  Na-ra-si-ṅha-gu-pta) Baladitya was an emperor of the Gupta Empire of North India. He was son of Purugupta and probably the successor of Budhagupta.

Defeat of the Hunas

According to the Chinese monk Xuanzang, Narasimhagupta had to pay tribute to the Huna king Mihirakula.

Finally, Baladitya along with Yasodharman of Malwa is credited with driving the Alchon Huns from the plains of North India according to the Chinese monk Xuanzang. In a fanciful account, Xuanzang, who wrote a century later in 630 CE, reported that Mihirakula had conquered all India except for an island where the king of Magadha named Balditya (who could be Gupta ruler Narasimhagupta Baladitya) took refuge, but that Mihirakula was finally captured by the Indian king, who later spared his life. Mihirakula is then said to have returned to Kashmir to retake the throne.

Narasimhagupta's governor in Malwa, Bhanugupta may also have been involved in this conflict.

shramanic philanthropy
The Guptas were traditionally a Hindu dynasty. Narasimhagupta Baladitya however, according to contemporary writer Paramartha, was brought up under the influence of the Mahayana philosopher, Vasubandhu. According to the Manjushrimulakalpa (c. 800 CE), king Narasimhsagupta became a Buddhist monk, and left the world through meditation (Dhyana).

The Chinese monk Xuanzang also noted that Baladitya's son, Vajra, who commissioned a sangharama as well, "possessed a heart firm in faith".

His clay sealing has been found in Nalanda. The name of his queen mentioned in the Nalanda sealing is Shrimitradevi. He was succeeded by his son Kumaragupta III.

Coinage

References

Sources

5th-century Indian monarchs
Gupta Empire